"Don't throw the baby out with the bathwater" is an idiomatic expression for an avoidable error in which something good or of value is eliminated when trying to get rid of something unwanted.

A slightly different explanation suggests this flexible catchphrase has to do with discarding the essential while retaining the superfluous because of excessive zeal.

History 

This idiom derives from a German proverb, das Kind mit dem Bade ausschütten. The earliest record of this phrase is in 1512, in Narrenbeschwörung (Appeal to Fools) by Thomas Murner, which includes a woodcut illustration showing a woman tossing a baby out with waste water. It is a common catchphrase in German, with examples of its use in work by Martin Luther, Johannes Kepler, Johann Wolfgang von Goethe, Otto von Bismarck, Thomas Mann, and Günter Grass.

Thomas Carlyle adapted the concept in an 1849 essay on slavery:

Carlyle is urging his readers to join in the struggle to end slavery, but he also encourages them to be mindful of the need to try to avoid harming the slaves in the process.

Alternative expressions 
The meaning and intent of the English idiomatic expression is sometimes presented in different terms.  
 Throw out the champagne with the cork
 Empty the baby out with the bath
Don't scour the Teflon when you wash a pan

References

Notes

Citations

Bibliography 

  
 Cheng Lim Tan. (2002). Advanced English Idioms for Effective Communication. Singapore: Singapore Asian Publications. ; 
 Nichols, James. (1995). Assessment Case Studies: Common Issues in Implementation with Various Campus Approaches to Resolution.  New York: Agathon Press. ; 

 Shaw Bernard and Edwin Wilson. (1961). Shaw on Shakespeare: an Anthology of Bernard Shaw's Writings on Plays and Production of Shakespeare. New York: E.F. Dutton. reprinted in 2002 by Applause Theatre & Cinema Books, New York. ; 
 Wilton, David. (2004). Word Myths: Debunking Linguistic Urban Legends. New York: Oxford University Press. ; ;

External links 

  — audio excerpt from the Ricky Gervais Show

English-language idioms
Bathing